Abacetus lucidulus is a species of ground beetle in the subfamily Pterostichinae. It was described by Louis Péringuey in 1896.

References

lucidulus
Beetles described in 1896